Ross Corner may refer to:
Ross Corner, New Jersey
Ross Corner, California
Ross Corner, Nova Scotia

See also
Ross Corners, New York